St. Ignatius College Preparatory, commonly referred to as SI, is a private, Catholic preparatory school in the Jesuit tradition, serving the San Francisco Bay Area since 1855.  Located in the Roman Catholic Archdiocese of San Francisco, in the Sunset District of San Francisco, St. Ignatius is one of the oldest secondary schools in the U.S. state of California.

History
St. Ignatius was founded as a one-room schoolhouse on Market Street by Anthony Maraschi, a Jesuit priest, just after the California Gold Rush in 1855. Maraschi paid $11,000 for the property which was to become the original church and schoolhouse. The church opened on July 15, 1855, and three months later, on October 15, the school opened its doors to its first students.

SI was the high school division of what later became the University of San Francisco, but it has since split from the university and changed locations five times due to the growth of the student body and natural disaster. In the 1860s, the school built a new site, adjacent to the first, on Market Street in downtown San Francisco.  In 1880, SI moved its campus to a location on Van Ness Avenue in the heart of San Francisco, and by 1883, SI had become the largest Jesuit school in the nation.

Within 26 years of the relocation, however, St. Ignatius would be completely destroyed. Though the school would survive the tremors of the 1906 earthquake with only moderate damage, the subsequent fires destroyed the school and church, forcing SI to find a new location near Golden Gate Park, a hastily constructed "temporary" wooden building, affectionately known as the "Shirt Factory", which housed the school from 1906 to 1929.

In 1927, the high school was separated from the university, becoming St. Ignatius High School. Two years later, SI relocated its campus once more, this time to Stanyan Street, where it remained for 40 years. In the fall of 1969, Father Harry Carlin moved SI to its current Sunset District campus, whereupon the current name, St. Ignatius College Preparatory, was adopted.

Though founded as an all-boys school, SI became coeducational in 1989 and is now home to over 1,500 male and female students. The school celebrated its 150th anniversary in 2005.

Academics and student body

In 2004 the faculty was one of 12 schools nationwide to be honored by Today's Catholic Teacher magazine for excellence and innovation in education.

St. Ignatius offers accelerated, honors, and Advanced Placement classes.

1,507 high school and 82 middle school students were enrolled in 2021-2022.

The current diversity in 2021-2022 is:

 43.4% Caucasian
 5% Latino
 7.6% Latino+
 13.3% Asian
 8.2% Asian+
 4.6% Filipino
 4.7% Filipino+
 3.2% Black
 2.3% Black+
 1% Pacific Islander
 6.2% Other/Unclassified

Note: Categories with a + sign indicate students who identify with more than one ethnicity.

Athletics
The school has 66 athletic teams with over 70% of students participating. The Wildcats generally participate in the Western Catholic Athletic League (WCAL) in the Central Coast Section (CCS) of California, though for some sports, the teams belong to other leagues.

The SI men's rowing team won the US Rowing Youth National Championships in 1997, 2005, and 2006. In addition, the crew competed in the Henley Royal Regatta in England, where St. Ignatius won Princess Elizabeth Challenge Cup in 2006. In 2022, the varsity men's team placed 4th in the SRAA National Championship under the Boys JV 8+ category.

The SI women's rowing team placed third in the SRAA National Championship under the Girls Ltwt Varsity 8+ category and 6th under the JV 8+ category. 

The SI men's lacrosse team won the state championship and was ranked nationally in 2008, 2013, 2015, 2017, and 2022. The Cats have won the WCAL Championship 14 years in a row. In 2017 the Wildcats finished ranked number 5 nationally with a 19–2 record, beating number 6 ranked Chaminade, NY and number 14 ranked Gonzaga, D.C. St. Ignatius has a powerhouse lacrosse program, known nationwide for sending student-athletes to Ivy League and ACC schools.

The SI women's lacrosse team has historically seen success as well, winning the WCAL title for five years straight from 1997 to 2001. The team also won CCS in 2022 and ended the season as the 12th best in the country.

The SI men's soccer team has been nationally ranked by ESPN. The boys won the WCAL championship in 2009, 2010, 2011, 2017, 2018, and 2019, and the CCS championship in 2009, 2017, and 2018. They won the inaugural Northern California championship in 2018 and were ranked number 2 nationally to end the season.

The women's soccer team has also been quite successful, as the reigning WCAL champions. The team went undefeated in league play to capture the 2019 WCAL crown.

The SI football team were WCAL champions in 1967, 2006, and 2019, as well as CCS Division III champions in 2006 and 2011. In 2012 SI placed first in the WCAL and competed in the CCS Division I playoffs.

The SI men's swim team placed 3rd in CCS Div I and the 200 Freestyle relay team broke the CCS Record in prelims and then was ranked 10th nationally in the All-American rankings in 2014. In 2015, the men placed 4th in CCS Div I with a CCS championship in the 200 Freestyle, and also placed 6th at the Inaugural California State Championship. In 2017, the men placed 6th in CCS Div I with a CCS championship in the 200 Freestyle relay.

The SI women's swim team has seen much success in the WCAL Championship in recent years, with the varsity team winning in 2007 and 2019 and the junior varsity team winning in 2005, 2006, 2007, 2017, 2018, and 2019. In both 2007 and 2008, the women placed 4th in CCS Div I with a CCS championship in the 200 Medley relay. In 2022 the women placed first in CCS Div I, with CCS Championships in the 200 Medley relay, 100 Butterfly, and 200 Freestyle relay, with the 200 Medley and 200 Freestyle relay teams qualifying for the National Interscholastic Swim Coaches Association(NISCA) All American.

The SI men's basketball team made it all the way to the regional finals of the CIF Division 1 playoffs in 2022.

The SI men's and women's cross country teams recently won the 2019 CCS Division III Championship, while the men's water polo team won the Division II Championship, as well as a Northern California Championship.

The SI field hockey team has experienced much success over the past few years, making history in 2018 by advancing to the CCS semifinals.

Saint Ignatius also hosts esports teams for Rocket League and League of Legends, with the former winning the state championship and the latter placing 8th in California in 2019.

Rivalry with Sacred Heart Cathedral

St. Ignatius' traditional rival is Sacred Heart Cathedral Preparatory, also located in San Francisco. The SI-SH rivalry began with a rugby game on St. Patrick's Day in 1893. SI and SH compete against each other in football, basketball, baseball, and volleyball for the Bruce-Mahoney Trophy, which is named after Bill Bruce of SI and Jerry Mahoney of SH, alumni who died in World War II.  SI has a significant edge over SH, with a winning record of 53-20-3 for the trophy.

Notable alumni

 Bradford Dillman – actor
 Dutch Ruether – Major League Baseball pitcher in three World Series 
 John Paul Getty, Jr. – philanthropist (attended, did not graduate)
 John Joseph Montgomery, 1878 – aviation pioneer
 Charles H. Strub, 1902 – dentist, sports entrepreneur
 Daniel J. Callaghan, 1907 – Medal of Honor recipient
 William Callaghan, 1914 – military, first commanding officer of 
 Richard Egan, 1939 – actor
John Jay O'Connor, 1947 – lawyer and husband of former Supreme Court Justice Sandra Day O'Connor
 George Moscone, 1947 – 37th mayor of San Francisco
 William H. Briare, 1948 – 18th mayor of Las Vegas
 George Stanley, 1951 – award-winning poet and member of the San Francisco Renaissance
 Gordon Getty, 1951 – billionaire and businessman
 Jerry Brown, 1955 – 32nd and 39th Governor of California
 Gil Haskell, 1961 – Former American football coach, offensive coordinator for the Seattle Seahawks from 2000 to 2008
 Al Saunders, 1964 – NCAA Academic All-American Football player, NFL Coach 38 years, HC San Diego Chargers
 Bob Portman, 1965 – Creighton University basketball player, Golden State Warriors player
 Laurence Yep, 1966 – author
Robert Francis Christian, O.P., 1966 – former auxiliary bishop of the Archdiocese of San Francisco
 Paul Otellini, 1968 – President and CEO of Intel
 Dan Fouts, 1969 – NFL Pro Bowl quarterback, played for the San Diego Chargers, NFL Hall of Fame
 Kevin Shelley, 1973 – California Secretary of State from 2003 to 2005
 Dan Salvemini, 1975 – professional soccer player and member of 1980 US Olympic team
 Bartlett Sher, 1977 – Tony Award-winning stage director, known for directing the 2008 Broadway revival of South Pacific
 Anthony Cistaro, 1981 – actor
 Francis Jue, 1981 – actor
Luke Brugnara, 1981 – businessman, casino mogul.
 Derek Lam, 1984 – fashion designer
 Levy Middlebrooks, 1984 – former professional basketball player
 Stephen McFeely, 1987 – American screenwriter and producer
 Al Madrigal, 1989 – comedian (Daily Show)
 Mark Farrell, 1992 – 44th mayor of San Francisco
 Gwendoline Yeo, 1994 – Singaporean actress
 Igor Olshansky, 2000 – NFL football player, defensive lineman for the Miami Dolphins
 Honey Mahogany, 2002 – American activist, politician, drag performer, and singer
 Darren Criss, 2005 – musician, actor, singer-songwriter, composer
 Nicholas Miller, 2009 – Professional DJ 
 Jacqueline Toboni, 2010 – American actress
 Matt Krook, 2013 – baseball player

See also
San Francisco high schools

References

External links
St. Ignatius College Preparatory 

 

Educational institutions established in 1855
High schools in San Francisco
Jesuit high schools in the United States
Roman Catholic Archdiocese of San Francisco
Catholic secondary schools in California
Sunset District, San Francisco
San Francisco Dons basketball venues 
Buildings and structures burned in the 1906 San Francisco earthquake
1855 establishments in California